Thelymitra javanica is a member of the family Orchidaceae.

References

javanica
Taxa named by Carl Ludwig Blume